Kadin Island is an island in the Alaska Panhandle of southeastern Alaska. It is located in the mouth of the Stikine River,  NW of Wrangell Island, Alexander Archipelago.

It belongs administratively to the City and Borough of Wrangell.

This island was named in 1863 by the surveyors of the Russian corvette Rynda after pilot Mikhail Kadin, an Aleut born in Atka, who was also a member of the surveying party. Kadin drew the charts in the Tebenkov atlas, along with Kozma Terentev in Sitka between 1848 and 1850.

References

 

Islands of Wrangell, Alaska
Islands of the Alexander Archipelago
Islands of Alaska